Returning Home is a Canadian documentary film, directed by Sean Stiller and released in 2021. The film is a portrait of Phyllis Webstad, an Indian residential school survivor who founded Orange Shirt Day, and depicts both her national speaking tour about the residential schools and the activism of her home Secwepemc community around the decline of the Pacific salmon.

It was the first full-length feature film ever produced by Canadian Geographic magazine.

The film premiered on the online platform of the Lunenburg Doc Fest on September 26, 2021, before having its official theatrical premiere on September 27 at the Chan Centre for the Performing Arts in Vancouver, British Columbia. It was subsequently screened at the Calgary International Film Festival, the Edmonton International Film Festival and the 2021 Vancouver International Film Festival.

Awards

References

External links

2021 films
2021 documentary films
Canadian documentary films
Documentary films about First Nations
Works about residential schools in Canada
2020s English-language films
2020s Canadian films